Pogue is American pejorative military slang for non-infantry MOS (military occupational specialty) staff, and other rear-echelon or support units.

History and etymology 
The term was used as early as the First World War by US Marines to refer to a male homosexual.  At the beginning of World War II, "pogue" was used by Marine drill instructors to refer to trainees believed not to meet the expected standards or failing to display the appropriate esprit de corps.

Linda Reinberg includes it as being in general use in Vietnam to refer to rear echelon support personnel.  This meaning, as well as the "substandard performance" connotation, continued into the beginning of the Global War on Terror.

During Desert Storm in Saudi Arabia and Kuwait, "pog" referred to anyone who arrived in theater after the speaker.

"Pogey bait" is a reference to sweets or candy, which was in usage in the military as early as 1918. The term alludes to food (and other luxuries) rarely afforded to grunts in the field. To an infantry soldier, the term "pogey bait", when used in the possessive sense (i.e. "my pogey bait", "his pogey bait", etc.), refers to a personally acquired (not issued) stash of snacks and food. Common items found in a bag of "pogey bait" include ramen noodles, hard candies (e.g., Werther's Originals, Jolly Ranchers, Dum Dums, etc.), beef jerky, Easy Cheese, and Vienna sausages (among other things). "Pogey bait" was/is used "in the field" not only as snacks and meal supplements, but also for bartering (commonly either for other food or for tobacco products). "Pogey-bait run" was used as early as the 1960s to refer to any unauthorized violation of restrictions with the purpose of meeting a wife or girlfriend.

Origin 
One accounting of the word's etymology involves "póg," the Irish language word for "kiss." In this telling it is believed that "pogue" was popularized within the American military by Irish-American soldiers during the American Civil War. The oft-used acronym "POG," standing for "Person Other than Grunt," may have originated as a backronym for "pogue."

Gay culture 
Among early 20th century gay men, "pogie" was a term for man who enjoys receptive anal sex.

Related terms 
The terms REMF (Standing for "Rear Echelon Mother Fucker") and "Fobbit" (from forward operating base (FOB) and The Hobbit) are closely related terms, in that they are frequently intended as insults (although "fobbit" seems to be taken as less a term of direct abuse and more a descriptive one). Among other services, other terms include "nonner" and "shoe clerk".

See also 
 FNG – "Fucking New Guy"

References

External links 

Military slang and jargon
Pejorative terms for in-group non-members